Serenity is  a modern English name taken from the word “serenity” meaning “peaceful”. 

The name has risen in popularity in the United States in recent years. It has ranked among the top 500 names given to newborn American girls since 2000 and among the top 100 names for newborn girls since 2009.  It is a name that is notably more commonly used by whites in rural states of the United States compared with those in more urban areas.

See also
Serenity (actress), stage name of Sonya Elizabeth Lane (born 1969), American former pornographic actress, journalist, and animal rights advocate

Notes 

English-language feminine given names